Amelia Ellen Bruckner (born March 28, 1991) is an American actress and singer noted for her roles in the Disney Channel shows Phil of the Future and American Dragon: Jake Long. Bruckner has also been featured in Hollywood films such as Nancy Drew, in which she plays Bess Marvin and in Rebound in the role of "Annie".

Biography

Personal life
Bruckner was raised in Conifer, Colorado. She has an older sister, Annye Landaverde (née Bruckner). Amy graduated from Athens Academy in Athens, Georgia, and attended the Gallatin School at New York University. She attended law school at UCLA School of Law from 2019 to 2021. She is now an associate at Katten Muchin and Rosenman LLP.

Film and television
Bruckner began her career in the fourth grade, guest starring in shows like ER, Malcolm In the Middle, The West Wing, Oliver Beene, Judging Amy, and Ally McBeal.

Music
She sang a backing soprano vocal role in Cinderella's song "A Dream Is a Wish Your Heart Makes" with the Disney Channel Circle of Stars.

Filmography

References

External links

1991 births
Living people
People from Conifer, Colorado
Actresses from Colorado
American child actresses
American child singers
American film actresses
American television actresses
Tisch School of the Arts alumni
21st-century American actresses
21st-century American singers